The Folkerts SK-3 a.k.a. "Jupiter, Pride of Lemont" was the third in a series of air racers developed by Clayton Folkerts.

Design and development
The SK-3 was built for mechanic Rudy A. Kling from Lemont, Illinois as his personal racing aircraft. Kling assisted in the construction of the aircraft. The Folkerts SK-2 was the basis for the aircraft, with a slight upscaling in size with a larger Menasco C6-S engine.

The SK-3 was a midwinged conventional aircraft with retractable landing gear. The fuselage was long and slender. The thin wings used spruce spars, plywood covering, and incorporated split flaps. The fuselage was welded steel tubing with aircraft fabric covering, built in two parts that were bolted together. The manual retractable landing gear used a single lever, rather than earlier crank systems. There were two  forward fuel tanks, a  main, and an auxiliary of  mounted behind the cockpit. The Menasco C6-S was modified by Kling to produce  at 3300 rpm, versus the standard  output.

Operational history
Rudy Kling was the exclusive pilot of the SK-3. Kling had only 150 hours experience in a J-5-powered Travel Air before flying the racer.

On December 3, 1937, during the 1938 Miami Air Races, the SK-3 crashed in the wash of a larger aircraft with Kling dying on his 29th birthday.

Variants
SK-4
Unlike other SK racers which were progressively improved, the SK-4 built at Kansas City municipal airport was a copy of the SK-3 aircraft with a goal of attaining a  maximum speed from a new metal propeller. Roger Don Rae flew in the 1938 National Air Races, but dropped out due to wing flutter. In the 1939 National Air Races, pilot Del Bush crashed. Folkerts did not build any more racers after the SK-4.

Specifications (Folkerts SK-3)

See also

References

Notes

Bibliography

 Foxworth, Thomas G. The Speed Seekers. New York: New York: Doubleday, 1976. .
 Matthews, Birch. Race with the Wind: How Air Racing Advanced Aviation. Minneapolis, Minnesota: Zenith Publishing, 2001. .
 Matowitz, Thomas G. Jr. Cleveland's National Air Races (Images of Aviation). Mount Pleasant, South Carolina: Arcadia Publishing, 2006. .
 Schmid, Sylvester H. and Truman C. Weaver. The Golden Age of Air Racing: 1927–1933. Oshkosh, Wisconsin: EAA Aviation Foundation, 1983. .
 Vorderman, Don. The Great Air Races. New York: Doubleday, 1969.

Racing aircraft
Mid-wing aircraft
Single-engined tractor aircraft
Aircraft first flown in 1937